Abdelillah Mame (born 10 November 1975) is a Paralympian athlete from Morocco competing mainly in category T13 middle-distance events.

He competed in the 2008 Summer Paralympics in Beijing, China.  There he won a gold medal in the men's 800 metres - T13 event, finished fourth in the men's 400 metres - T13 event and finished sixth in the men's 1500 metres - T13 event

References

External links 
 

1975 births
Living people
Moroccan male middle-distance runners
Paralympic athletes of Morocco
Paralympic gold medalists for Morocco
Paralympic bronze medalists for Morocco
Athletes (track and field) at the 2008 Summer Paralympics
Athletes (track and field) at the 2012 Summer Paralympics
Athletes (track and field) at the 2016 Summer Paralympics
Medalists at the 2008 Summer Paralympics
Medalists at the 2012 Summer Paralympics
Paralympic medalists in athletics (track and field)